The family of the composer Richard Wagner:

Family of Carl Friedrich Wagner
Carl Friedrich Wilhelm Wagner (1770–1813), a police actuary  ∞ 1798 Johanna Rosine Pätz (1778–1848), daughter of a baker (after being widowed, in 1814 she became the partner of the painter, actor and writer Ludwig Geyer (1779–1821), whose rumoured paternity of Richard Wagner is neither substantiated nor disproved).
 Albert Wagner (1799–1874), opera singer and stage director  ∞ 1828 Elise Gollmann (1800–1864)
 Franziska Wagner (1829–1895)  ∞ 1854 Alexander Ritter (1833–1896), musician and composer
 Marie Wagner (1831–1876)  ∞ 1851 Karl Jacoby, merchant
 Johanna Wagner (adopted) (1828–1894), daughter of Eduard Freiherr von Bock von Wülfingen, opera singer and actress  ∞ 1859 Alfred Jachmann (1829–1918), district administrator
 Carl Gustav Wagner (1801–1802)
 Rosalie Wagner (1803–1837), actress  ∞ 1836 Oswald Marbach (1810–1890), university professor
 Carl Julius Wagner (1804–1862)
 Luise Wagner (1805–1872), actress  ∞ 1828  (1800–1865), publisher
 Klara Wagner (1807–1875), opera singer  ∞ 1829 Heinrich Wolfram (1800–1874), opera singer, later a merchant
 Maria Theresia Wagner (1809–1814)
 Ottilie Wagner (1811–1883)  ∞ 1836 Hermann Brockhaus (1806–1877), orientalist
 Richard Wagner (1813–1883), composer  ∞ 1. 1836 Minna Planer (1809–1866), actress ∞ 2. 1870 Cosima Liszt (1837–1930), daughter of Franz Liszt and Marie d'Agoult, divorced in 1870 from the conductor Hans von Bülow, mother of five children (including Cosima's two daughters with Bülow, Blandine and Daniela, Wagner's step-children):
 Isolde Ludowitz von Bülow (1865–1919)  ∞ 1900  (1872–1930), music director
  (1901–1981)
 Eva von Bülow (1867–1942)  ∞ 1908 Houston Stewart Chamberlain (1855–1927), author
 Siegfried Wagner (1869–1930), composer, conductor and stage director  ∞ 1915 Winifred Marjorie Williams (1897–1980), adopted daughter of the pianist Karl Klindworth
 Wieland Wagner (1917–1966), stage director  ∞ 1941 Gertrud Reissinger (1916–1998), dancer and choreographer
  (1942–2014)
  (born 1943),∞ 1. Malo Osthoff∞ 2. Eleonore Gräfin Lehndorff
 Joy Olivia Wagner
 Nike Wagner (born 1945), dramaturg and publicist,∞ 1. Jean Launay∞ 2. Jürg Stenzl (born 1942), musicologist
 Louise Launay
 Daphne Wagner (born 1946), actress∞ 1. Udo Proksch (1934–2001) businessman and industrialist (murderer convicted in the Lucona case)  ∞ 2. Tilman Spengler (born 1947) author and publisher
 Friedelind Wagner (1918–1991)
 Wolfgang Wagner (1919–2010), stage director,
 ∞ 1943 Ellen Drexel (1919–2002), divorced 1976
 Eva Wagner-Pasquier (born 1945), theatre manager  ∞ Yves Pasquier, film producer
 Antoine Amadeus Wagner-Pasquier (born 1982)
 Gottfried Wagner (born 1947), musicologist ∞ 1. Beatrix Kraus∞ 2. Teresina Rosetti
 Eugenio Wagner (born 1987)
 ∞ 1976 Gudrun Mack-Armann (1944–2007)
 Katharina Wagner (born 1978), stage director
 Verena Wagner (1920–2019)  ∞ 1943 Bodo Lafferentz (1897–1974), Nazi Party member and SS Obersturmbannführer
 Amélie Lafferentz (born 1944)  ∞ Manfred Hohmann
 Christopher Hohmann
 Manfred Lafferentz (born 1945)  ∞ Gunhild Mix
 Leif Henning Lafferentz (born 1979)
 Winifred Lafferentz (born 1947)  ∞ Paul Arminjon
 Wendy Arminjon (born 1973)
 Mathias Arminjon (born 1981)
 Wieland Lafferentz (born 1949)  ∞ Isabella Weiß
 Verena Maja Lafferentz (born 1981), jazz singer
 Verena Lafferentz (born 1952)  ∞ Tilo Schnekenburger

Family of Ludwig Geyer
The widowed Johanna Wagner, became the partner of Ludwig Geyer in 1814. It is assumed that they married although no evidence has been found of this. It has been speculated that Geyer was Richard Wagner's biological father.
 
Ludwig Geyer (1779–1821) ∞? 1815 Johanna Wagner
Caecilie Geyer (1815–1893) ∞ Eduard Avenarius (1809-1885)
 Richard Avenarius (1843–1896)
  (1887–1954)
 Ferdinand Avenarius (1856–1923)

See also
 Wagner (surname)

Further reading 

Carr, Jonathan: The Wagner Clan: The Saga of Germany's Most Illustrious and Infamous Family. Atlantic Monthly Press, 2007.

External links
 Wagner Family Tree
 Wagner Family Tree (English)

 
German families